The Omega European Masters is the Swiss stop on professional men's golf's European Tour, and in 2009 it became the first event in Europe to be co-sanctioned by the Asian Tour.

Founded as the Swiss Open in 1923, the tournament was prefixed with European Masters in 1983, before dropping Swiss Open from the title in 1992. During the 1971 event, Baldovino Dassù became the first player to score 60 for 18 holes on the European circuit. The tournament has been held at the Golf-Club Crans-sur-Sierre at Crans-Montana in Valais since 1939, and is currently played in early September each year.

Michelle Wie at 2006 tournament
In May, 2006, Michelle Wie, who has a sponsorship contract with Omega, accepted an invitation from the company to play in the 2006 tournament, making her first attempt to play on the European Tour. At the September event she shot 78–79 to finish 15-over-par over two rounds and finished in last place among the 156 competitors.  European Tour executive director George O'Grady said on September 8, 2006 that Wie's appearance was "an experiment" and he would need "a lot of persuading" before inviting Wie to participate in such an event again, despite record crowds estimated at 9,500.

Winners

Notes

References

External links
 
Coverage on the European Tour's official site
Coverage on the Asian Tour's official site

European Tour events
Former Asian Tour events
Golf tournaments in Switzerland
Recurring sporting events established in 1923
1923 establishments in Switzerland